Yuval Scharf (born 4 June 1985) is an Israeli film, television and theatre actress, and model.

Early life
Scharf was born in Tel Aviv, Israel, to a family of Ashkenazi Jewish (Polish-Jewish) descent.

Career

Television and Cinema

In 2018 she played Tanya in the BBC drama McMafia. She plays Rochel, an Ashkenazi love interest of a Mizrahi Israeli, in the TV show Beauty Queen of Jerusalem.

Theatre
At the Beit Lessin Theater she participated in several plays: In 2008, she played Jill in the play Aquus and played in the play Alma and Ruth; In 2009 she participated in the play Conditions of Affection and in 2010 participated in the play Uncle Vanya.

References

External links

Yuval Scharf on The Idibe 
 

Israeli film actresses
Israeli stage actresses
Israeli female models
1985 births
Living people
Israeli Ashkenazi Jews
Israeli people of Polish-Jewish descent